William Barton (1748–1831) was an officer in the Continental Army during the American Revolutionary War who retired with the rank of colonel. He later served as adjutant general of the Rhode Island militia.

Early years and enlistment
Barton was born in Warren, Rhode Island on May 26, 1748. He worked as a hatter in Providence, Rhode Island. In 1771, he married Rhoda Carver. In 1775, he enlisted in the Continental Army as a corporal. He fought in the Battle of Bunker Hill.

Revolutionary War service
On August 2, 1775 he was appointed the adjutant of Richmond's Rhode Island Regiment.  He was promoted to captain on November 1, 1775.

In late June and early July 1777, as a major in the Rhode Island state troops, he planned and led a raid on British headquarters, capturing Major General Richard Prescott. On the night of July 10–11, with 38 men and six officers in five whaleboats, Barton crossed Narragansett Bay, passed unobserved by three British frigates, and, landing about halfway between Newport and Bristol Ferry, went to the farm house where Prescott had his headquarters. The guards were surprised, the door of Prescott's room was broken in, and the general was hurried away half dressed and taken to Warwick Point, and afterward to Providence. For this exploit, the Continental Congress gave Barton a sword and passed a resolution honoring his service.

Barton was promoted to lieutenant colonel on November 10, 1777 and was made colonel of Stanton's regiment of the Rhode Island State Troops on December 1 with "rank and pay of colonel in the Continental Army" upon the resignation of Colonel Joseph Stanton, Jr.  On December 19, Barton was re-appointed as colonel of his regiment when the enlistments of its members expired.  Soldiers were re-enlisted for a term expiring on March 16, 1779.  The regiment was part of the Rhode Island State Troops which was a brigade, commanded by Brigadier General Ezekiel Cornell, which consisted of two regiments of infantry and one of artillery for the defense of Rhode Island.  In addition to Barton the other regiment of infantry was commanded by Colonel Archibald Crary and the artillery regiment by Colonel Robert Eliot.  In February 1778, Barton was commissioned in the Continental Army and command of the regiment was given to Colonel John Topham.

Barton was gravely wounded in the thigh while trying to rally American militia to attack the rear guard of a British raiding party that burned parts of Bristol and Warren, Rhode Island, on May 25, 1778. He never fully recovered from this injury, but did return in June 1779 to lead a battalion of light infantry, called the "Corps of Light Infantry", which consisted of four companies of 54 men each and operated in boats patrolling Narragansett Bay.  Barton served in this capacity until the end of the war.

After the revolution
In 1783 Barton became an original member of the Rhode Island Society of the Cincinnati.

When Rhode Island ratified the United States Constitution in 1790, Barton was sent to New York to notify George Washington.

After the Revolution Barton was active in the state militia.  He served as the brigadier general in command of the Providence County Brigade from May 1794 until he became major general in command of the Rhode Island Militia from May 1802 to May 1809.

He helped to found the town of Barton, Vermont. Subsequently, Barton was successfully sued in court for selling the same land to two different parties. He refused to pay this debt. For this he was ultimately confined to the debtors' prison in Danville for 14 years, starting at the age of sixty-four.
At the age of seventy-seven, he was released at the initiative of the visiting Marquis de Lafayette, who agreed to pay the balance of his debt.

Death and legacy
Barton died on October 22, 1831, at the age of eighty-three. He is buried in the North Burial Ground in Providence, Rhode Island.

Fort Barton in Rhode Island was named after William Barton. It is now a park owned by the town of Tiverton, Rhode Island.

Near Fort Barton—off of Lawton Avenue—is Fort Barton Elementary School, one of Tiverton's three elementary schools.

References

External references
McBurney, Christian. Kidnapping the Enemy: The Special Operations to Capture Generals Charles Lee and Richard Prescott.  Yardley, PA: Westholme Publishing, 2014. . This book has as one of its main focuses Barton's capture of General Prescott and Barton's life after the war, including the story of his spending 14 years in a Vermont debtors' prison.
Boatner, Mark Mayo, III. Encyclopedia of the American Revolution. Revised ed. New York: McKay, 1974. .
Falkner, Leonard. "Captor of the Barefoot General". American Heritage Magazine 11:5 (August 1960).
Heitman, Francis B. Historical Register of Officers of the Continental Army during the War of the Revolution. New, enlarged, and revised edition. Washington, D.C.: Rare Book Shop Publishing Company, 1914. Available on Google Book Search,  page 90 shows Barton's service record and dates of promotions.

McBurney, Christian.  The Rhode Island Campaign: The First French and American Operation of the Revolutionary War. Yardley, PA: Westholme, Publishing, 2011.  .

Further reading

External links

 
 "Colonel William Barton" from the Aquidneck Island Chapter of the Daughters of the American Revolution, Newport, Rhode Island
Society of the Cincinnati
American Revolution Institute 

1748 births
1831 deaths
People from Barton, Vermont
People from Warren, Rhode Island
Continental Army officers from Rhode Island
Rhode Island militiamen in the American Revolution
People of colonial Rhode Island
Burials at North Burying Ground (Providence)